Triops cancriformis,  European tadpole shrimp or tadpole shrimp, is a species of tadpole shrimp found in Europe to the Middle East and India.

Due to habitat destruction, many populations have recently been lost across its European range, so, the species is considered endangered in the United Kingdom and in several European countries.

In the UK, there are just two known populations: in a pool and adjacent area in the Caerlaverock Wetlands in Scotland, and a temporary pond in the New Forest. The species is legally protected under Schedule 5 of the Wildlife and Countryside Act 1981 (as amended).

Fossils from the Upper Triassic (Norian) of Germany, around 237 million years old have been attributed to this species as the subspecies T. cancriformis minor, due to their great similarity to modern day members of the species. However, later research showed that their ontogenetic growth was quite different from the living species, and they were better considered a distinct species, "Notostraca" minor, with an uncertain position within Notostraca. Genetic evidence also indicates that T. cancriformis only diverged from other Triops species around 23.7–49.6 million years ago.

Life cycle
Triops cancriformis has a very fast life cycle, and individuals become mature in about two weeks after hatching. Their populations can be gonochoric, hermaphroditic or androdioecious. The latter is a very rare reproductive mode in animals, in which populations are made of hermaphrodites, with a small proportion of males. Due to this lack of males, early researchers thought Triops were parthenogenetic. The presence of testicular lobes scattered amongst their ovaries confirmed they were in fact hermaphroditic. Fertilized females or hermaphrodites produce diapausing eggs or cysts, able to survive decades in the sediment of the ponds and lakes they inhabit. These eggs are resistant to drought and temperature extremes.

Taxonomic history
In 1801, Louis Augustin Guillaume Bosc made the first officially recognised species description of Triops cancriformis. He named this species Apus cancriformis. Other authors used the name Apus cancriformis over the years but often with the wrong original author of this name. The genus name Apus was pre-occupied by a genus of birds (described in 1777), rendering the name invalid for the tadpole shrimp.

In 1909, Ludwig Keilhack used the correct name "Triops cancriformis (Bosc)" in a field identification key of the freshwater fauna of Germany. He took up the genus name proposed by Schrank and suggested that the genus name Apus be replaced with Triops Schrank since Apus had been used since 1777 as the genus name of some birds (commonly known as swifts). However, other authors disagreed with him and the controversy continued until the 1950s.

In 1955, Alan Longhurst provided the original author of T. cancriformis as "Triops cancriformis (Bosc, 1801)" with a full history of synonymy to support it. This was in a taxonomic review of the Notostraca that also supported using the genus name Triops instead of Apus. In 1958, the International Commission on Zoological Nomenclature (ICZN) recognised the name Triops cancriformis (Bosc, 1801–1802) (ICZN name no. 1476) as officially the oldest. They also recognised the genus name Triops Schrank instead of Apus. They followed Longhurst in these decisions.

Human uses

Although members of the genus Triops usually have no economic importance, the Beni-kabuto ebi albino variant of Triops cancriformis has been used to control mosquitoes and weeds in Asian rice fields.

Triops cancriformis is the second most common species raised by hobbyists next to Triops longicaudatus. They are particularly valued for their lower hatching temperature and somewhat longer lifespan as well as potentially larger size.

References

Taxa named by Louis Augustin Guillaume Bosc
Crustaceans described in 1801
Notostraca
Crustaceans of Asia
Crustaceans of Europe
Extant Late Triassic first appearances
Norian species first appearances
Rhaetian species
Hettangian species
Sinemurian species
Pliensbachian species
Toarcian species
Aalenian species
Bajocian species
Bathonian species
Callovian species
Oxfordian species
Kimmeridgian species
Tithonian species
Berriasian species
Valanginian species
Hauterivian species
Barremian species
Aptian species
Albian species
Cenomanian species
Turonian species
Coniacian species
Santonian species
Campanian species
Maastrichtian species
Danian species
Selandian species
Thanetian species
Ypresian species
Lutetian species
Bartonian species
Priabonian species
Rupelian species
Chattian species
Aquitanian species
Burdigalian species
Langhian species
Serravallian species
Tortonian species
Messinian species
Zanclean species
Piacenzian species
Gelasian species
Calabrian species
Ionian species
Tarantian species
Holocene species